Protein patched homolog 1 is a protein that is the member of the patched family and in humans is encoded by the PTCH1 gene.

Function 

PTCH1 is a member of the patched gene family and is the receptor for sonic hedgehog, a secreted molecule implicated in the formation of embryonic structures and in tumorigenesis. This gene functions as a tumor suppressor. The PTCH1 gene product, is a transmembrane protein that suppresses the release of another protein called smoothened, and when sonic hedgehog binds PTCH1, smoothened is released and signals cell proliferation.

Clinical significance 

Mutations of this gene have been associated with nevoid basal cell carcinoma syndrome (AKA Gorlin's Syndrome), esophageal squamous cell carcinoma, trichoepitheliomas, transitional cell carcinomas of the bladder, as well as holoprosencephaly. Alternative splicing results in multiple transcript variants encoding different isoforms. Additional splice variants have been described, but their full length sequences and biological validity cannot be determined currently.

Mutations in PTCH1 cause Gorlin syndrome and mutations have also been found in holoprosencephaly patients. Some of these patients present cleft lip and palate among  the holoprosencephaly features, and missense variants in PTCH1 were also found in a sequencing screening of nonsyndromic cleft lip and palate patients. In addition association between SNPs in or near PTCH1 have been found to be associated with nonsyndromic cleft lip and palate. Mutations in PTCH1 are also associated with medulloblastoma.

References

Further reading

External links
  GeneReviews/NCBI/NIH/UW entry on Nevoid Basal Cell Carcinoma Syndrome
  GeneReviews/NCBI/NIH/UW entry on 9q22.3 Microdeletion
 Drosophila patched - The Interactive Fly